Brunswick Circuit Pro Bowling 2 is a ten-pin bowling game released for PlayStation in 2000. It is the sequel to Brunswick Circuit Pro Bowling. It featured more characters (now including female characters), an easier throw system and many others.

Reception

The game received above-average reviews according to the review aggregation website GameRankings.

References

External links
 

2000 video games
Bowling video games
Multiplayer and single-player video games
PlayStation (console) games
PlayStation (console)-only games
THQ games
Video game sequels
Video games developed in the United States